Senator Black may refer to:

Members of the Northern Irish Senate
George Ruddell Black (1865/1866–1942), Northern Irish Senator in 1942

Members of the United States Senate
Hugo Black (1886–1971), U.S. Senator from Alabama from 1927 to 1937
John Black (U.S. senator) (1800–1854), U.S. Senator from Mississippi from 1832 to 1838

United States state senate members
C. Ellis Black (born 1942), Georgia State Senate
Dennis Black (born 1939), Iowa State Senate
Diane Black (born 1951), Tennessee State Senate
Dick Black (politician) (born 1944), Virginia State Senate
George Robison Black (1835–1886), Georgia State Senate
Henry Black (Maine politician) (1924–2002), Maine State Senate
J. Graham Black (1889–1957), Florida State Senate
John Black (Georgia politician) (1933–2017), Georgia State Senate
John Black (Wisconsin politician) (1830–1899), Wisconsin State Senate
Loring M. Black Jr. (1886–1956), New York State Senate
Sterling Foster Black (1924–1996), New Mexico State Senate
W. Rex Black (1920–2012), Utah State Senate